Oscar Thorstensen (13 July 1901 – 2 January 1966) was a Norwegian footballer. He played in six matches for the Norway national football team from 1924 to 1929.

References

External links
 

1901 births
1966 deaths
Norwegian footballers
Norway international footballers
Place of birth missing
Association footballers not categorized by position